The 1912 United States presidential election in California took place on November 5, 1912 as part of the 1912 United States presidential election. State voters chose 13 representatives, or electors, to the Electoral College, who voted for president and vice president.

California narrowly voted for the Progressive Party nominee, former president Theodore Roosevelt, over the Democratic nominee, New Jersey Governor Woodrow Wilson, though two electors cast their votes for Wilson. Although Roosevelt was the candidate of the “Bull Moose” Progressive Party nationally, in California and South Dakota he gained the support of the state Republican Party and acquired the "Republican" line, whilst the incumbent, and national GOP nominee William Howard Taft did not appear on the ballot and was a write-in candidate. Roosevelt's running mate was incumbent Governor of California Hiram Johnson.

This was the fourth occasion in which California's electoral vote was split, rather than being awarded to a single candidate. The previous occasions when this happened were in 1880, 1892, and 1896. This occurred because, at the time, electors were not awarded based upon the popular vote in the presidential preference vote. Instead, voters cast votes for individual electors, with the thirteen top vote-getters among elector nominees becoming elected the state's members of the United States Electoral College. A split in the electoral vote would never again occur in California.

This was the closest presidential election in California history, with Roosevelt winning by just 174 votes out of 677,944 cast, a margin of 0.02567%. It remains the fourth-closest presidential race in any state in history, behind Florida in 2000, Maryland in 1832, and Maryland in 1904, the latter of which also involved Roosevelt.

Although Wilson narrowly failed to win the state, he did become the first Democrat to carry Napa, Solano and Marin Counties since James Buchanan in 1856, the first to carry Sacramento County and Sierra County since Stephen A. Douglas in 1860, the first to win San Diego County since 1868, the first to ever carry Ventura County, which had been created in 1872, and the first to carry Sutter County since 1876. Since this election, Solano County has voted Democratic in all but six Republican landslide elections of 1920, 1924, 1928, 1972, 1980 and 1984.

With 41.83% of the popular vote, California would prove to be Roosevelt's second-strongest state in terms of popular vote percentage in the 1912 election after South Dakota.

Results

Results by county

Notes

References

California
1912
1912 California elections